Sari Agricultural Sciences and Natural Resources University is a public university in Iran. It was established in 1974 as a non-profit educational unit for the purpose of creating agricultural education courses. The university was originally called the Higher Agricultural Engineering School and offered general agricultural, forestry, rangeland and animal husbandry courses. In 1979, the Higher Agricultural Engineering School, along with several other centers, provided the foundation for the establishment of the University of Mazandaran in the city center of Babolsar. In 1997, after upgrading the facilities and capabilities, two colleges of agricultural sciences and natural resources were granted a single license, and they officially began their training activities in the academic year of 1997-1998.

According to the ranking of Iranian Universities, this public university is among the top three of agricultural and natural resources universities in the country.

References

External links
Official Website

Universities in Iran
Sari, Iran
Buildings and structures in Mazandaran Province
Education in Mazandaran Province